Wadi Helo (literally 'Sweet wadi') is a seasonal watercourse located in the Hajar Mountains of Sharjah, in the United Arab Emirates. The wadi runs northwest to southeast of the eponymous village of Wadi Helo, located on the Sharjah-Kalba highway.

Extent 
The wadi is a 'y' shaped waterway, one branch passing through the villages of Harrah and Wadi Helo, while the other runs down from the Wadi Helo lagoon, located further along the old Sharjah-Kalba highway towards Kalba. The new highway opened in October 2020, runs 26km from Wadi Helo to Kalba. The two branches of Wadi Helo meet west of the village of Awhala and the wadi passes through Awhala and beside the historic Awhala Fort before crossing the Omani border and fanning out to the Batinah plain and the Gulf of Oman north of the Omani coastal village of Bu Baqarah. The lower reaches of the wadi are lined to either side with a number of pre-Islamic burials.

Wadi Helo is traditionally home to the Mazari tribe and was a wealthy tobacco growing centre. Today the upper reaches of the wadi are dotted with hundreds of abandoned stone-lined tobacco plantations. Villagers from the village of Hayl would travel to Wadi Helo seasonally to take part in harvesting the tobacco crop, which would be sold to local traders in Fujairah and Sharjah.

Heritage site 
The heritage site of Wadi Helo, located some 4km from the modern settlement, includes the three watchtowers that guarded the wadi and the abandoned settlement, including extensive and sophisticated farmhouses such as Eisa Al Thabbahi's house, a home that reflects the considerable wealth of the 19th century agricultural community of Wadi Helo. A reconstructed Bronze Age tomb sits alongside the village fort. The settlement was abandoned in or around the 1930s. This area has been preserved as an archaeological site by the government of Sharjah and was part of Sharjah's 2018 bid for UNESCO World Heritage Status, under the heading 'Sharjah, Gateway to the Trucial States', which included the Heart of Sharjah; Sharjah Fort; the former barracks of the Trucial Oman Scouts in Mirgab; Al Mahatta Fort, the first airport in the Arab states of the Persian Gulf; Dhaid Fort and Oasis; the coastal town of Khor Fakkan; the oasis of Wadi Al Helo and Fili Fort, following the Heart of Sharjah theme of a return to the simplicity and natural lifestyles of the 1950s. The bid for UNESCO status has been discussed since 2014.

See also 
 List of wadis of the United Arab Emirates

References 

Rivers of the United Arab Emirates
Geography of the United Arab Emirates
Geography of the Emirate of Sharjah